William Tate (died 1540) was a Canon of Windsor from 1523 to 1540

Career
He was appointed:
Vicar of Everingham 1508 - 1524
Rector of Thwing 1509 - 1528
Treasurer of Beverley Minster 1520
Prebendary of York 1522 - 1540
Rector of Chelmsford 1522

He was appointed to the third stall in St George's Chapel, Windsor Castle in 1523 and held the canonry until 1540.

Notes 

1540 deaths
Canons of Windsor
Year of birth unknown